Mount Pleasant Township is an inactive township in Scotland County, in the U.S. state of Missouri.

Mount Pleasant Township was erected in 1836.

References

Townships in Missouri
Townships in Scotland County, Missouri